Cerace anthera is a species of moth of the family Tortricidae. It is found in China.

The wingspan is about 33 mm.

References

Moths described in 1950
Ceracini